Otomaco is an extinct language of the Venezuelan Llanos.

Documentation
Otomaco is known only from a single wordlist manuscript written by Father Gerónimo José de Luzena in December 1788, which is currently held at the Royal Palace of Madrid Library. The word list has been analyzed in detail by Rosenblat (1936).

References 

Extinct languages of South America
Otomákoan languages
Languages of Venezuela